The Chrysler World Headquarters and Technology Center (CTC) is the North American headquarters and main research and development facility for the automobile manufacturer Stellantis, formerly known as Fiat Chrysler Automobiles (FCA). The 504-acre complex is located next to Interstate 75 in Auburn Hills, Michigan, a northern suburb of Detroit. Completed in 1996, the complex has  of usable space, placing it among the largest buildings in the world by floor space.

History
Before moving to the Auburn Hills headquarters, Chrysler was based at the Highland Park Chrysler Plant campus, which predated the formation of the company itself. It was located along I-75, roughly 1 mile southeast of the Highland Park Ford Plant.

Planning for the Chrysler Technology Center began in 1984, and construction started in the fall of 1986. The facility was largely complete upon its dedication on October 15, 1991, and it reached full occupancy in 1993. During construction, a new exit with direct access to the complex was added to I-75.

On September 9, 1992, Chrysler announced that they would move their headquarters from the Highland Park complex to a new building at the Technology Center. Ground was broken on the 15-floor expansion in 1993, and it was completed in 1996. The tower, designed by SmithGroup, features a massive 35-foot-tall window at the top shaped like the company's Pentastar logo. At 249 feet tall, it is the tallest building in the city of Auburn Hills. The company's North American operations have been based in the tower since it was completed in 1996, including the entire DaimlerChrysler and Fiat Chrysler eras.

The Walter P. Chrysler Museum, opened in October 1999, was also located on the CTC campus. The museum closed in 2012. It reopened, with reduced hours, in 2016, and closed permanently in December that year. Chrysler then converted the museum building to office space, and it currently houses the US headquarters of Maserati and Alfa Romeo. Most of the vehicles from the museum were moved to an FCA facility in Detroit, but have not been on public display since.

Since the mid-2000s, Chrysler has regularly wrapped the west side of the tower with large advertisements for the company's vehicles, visible to motorists passing the complex on I-75.

Stellantis also maintains offices at the historic Chrysler House in downtown Detroit.

Design

CRSS Architects designed the Chrysler World Headquarters and Technology Center in a cross-axial formation where its elongated atrium topped concourses converge with an octagonal radiant skylight at its center. The rounded-off exterior corners of the tower are meant to evoke a polished car body.

The facility includes a full laboratory level with various wind tunnels,  evaluation road, noise, vibration, and harshness testing facility, electromagnetic compatibility center, climatic wind tunnel (able to create rain, snow, and extreme temperatures),and pilot production plant. A  training center was included from the start, with a teleconferencing center and fitness center. The basement hallways are large enough for two cars to pass each other, allowing some testing within the building; and the test cells have their own separate foundation, to avoid vibrating the rest of the complex.

During the automotive industry crisis of 2008–2010, some automotive news sites reported that the complex was designed to be converted to a shopping mall. This theory was later disproved, based on mall industry analysis and speculation from local real estate investors.

See also

Chrysler House
Lee Iacocca
List of largest buildings in the world
Sergio Marchionne
Walter P. Chrysler
History of Chrysler

Notes

References

Further reading

External links

 CTC history and facilities (Allpar)

Buildings and structures in Oakland County, Michigan
Chrysler
Auburn Hills, Michigan
Corporate headquarters in the United States
Office buildings completed in 1996
1996 establishments in Michigan